Cole Jermaine Palmer (born 6 May 2002) is an English professional footballer who plays as a midfielder or forward for  club Manchester City. He has represented England at youth level.

Club career
Born in Wythenshawe, Palmer was a boyhood fan who joined Manchester City at under-8's level and progressed through the Academy age groups before captaining the under-18s during the 2019–20 season.

On 30 September 2020, Palmer made his first team debut for City in a 3–0 away win over Burnley in the fourth round of the EFL Cup. On 21 September 2021, Palmer scored his first senior goal in a 6–1 home win over League One side Wycombe Wanderers in the EFL Cup. On 16 October, Palmer made an appearance in the Premier League against Burnley, and found himself playing and scoring a hat-trick for City's under-23's side that same night. On 19 October, Palmer scored his first UEFA Champions League goal in a 5–1 away win over Club Brugge. On 7 January 2022, Palmer scored on his FA Cup debut in a 4–1 away win over League Two side Swindon Town.

International career
Palmer represented the England under-17 team at the 2019 UEFA European Under-17 Championship.

On 27 August 2021, Palmer received his first call up for the England U21s. He scored a goal on his debut in a 2–0 U21 Euro Qualifying win over Kosovo U21.

Personal life
Palmer is of Kittitian descent through his father.

Career statistics

References

2002 births
Living people
People from Wythenshawe
Footballers from Manchester
English footballers
Association football forwards
Manchester City F.C. players
Premier League players
England youth international footballers
England under-21 international footballers
English sportspeople of Saint Kitts and Nevis descent